David Vincent is an American voice actor and director who provides voices for animation, anime and video games. Some of his roles include Grimmjow Jaegerjaquez in Bleach, Senketsu in Kill la Kill and Gilgamesh in Fate/Zero and Fate/stay night. In video games, he voices Male Robin in Fire Emblem Awakening, the Super Smash Bros. series and Code Name: S.T.E.A.M., Marshall Law in the Tekken series, T. Hawk in Super Street Fighter IV, Richter Belmont in Castlevania: The Dracula X Chronicles, and Jin Kisaragi and Hakumen in the BlazBlue series. He also had a guest role in Ghost in the Shell.

Filmography

Anime

Films

Animation

Video games

Live-action

References

External links 
 
 
 David Vincent and David Earnest at Crystal Acids Voice Actor Database
 
 
 "Kana's Korner" Interview With David Vincent on 91.8 The Fan

1972 births
Living people
American male video game actors
American male voice actors
Male actors from Los Angeles
University of Colorado Boulder alumni
21st-century American male actors